Niesułowice may refer to the following places in Poland:
Niesułowice, Lower Silesian Voivodeship (south-west Poland)
Niesułowice, Lesser Poland Voivodeship (south Poland)